Full house or Fullhouse or variation, may refer to:

Film and television
A Full House, a 1920 American silent comedy film
Full House, a 1987–1995 American TV sitcom
Full House (Armenian TV series), a 2014–2019 sitcom
Full House (British TV series), a 1985–1986 sitcom
Full House (South Korean TV series), a 2004 romantic comedy series
Full House (Philippine TV series), a 2009-2010 adaptation of the South Korean series
"The Full House", an episode of Jeeves and Wooster

Literature
 Full House (manhwa), a South Korean manhwa series
 Full House: The Spread of Excellence from Plato to Darwin, a book by Stephen J. Gould
 Fullhouse (comic strip), a U.S. nationally syndicated comic strip by Harry Devlin

Music

Albums
 Full House (The Dooleys album), 1980
 Full House (Fairport Convention album), 1970
 "Live" Full House (The J. Geils Band album), 1972
 Full House (Frankie Miller album), 1977
 Full House (John Farnham album), 1991
 Full House (Wes Montgomery album), 1962

Songs
 "Fullhouse" (song), a 1978 Kate Bush song off the album Lionheart
 "Full House", a Wes Montgomery song off the 1962 album Full House

Sports and games
 Full house (poker), a type of poker hand
 Full house, a scoring category in Yahtzee
 Full house, or full count, a term in baseball and softball

Other uses
Full House (aircraft), a World War II bomber that participated in the atomic bomb attack on Hiroshima
Full house (audience), full-capacity attendance at a concert, cinema or theatrical production
Fullhouse (company), a marketing agency, subsidiary of Laughlin Constable
Full House Entertainment, an Indian film production company
 M2 Fullhouse, a van manufactured by Mazda division M2 (Mazda)
SGI Indigo², a 1990s workstation computer codenamed "Fullhouse"

See also

Ful Haus, a 2007–2009 Philippine TV sitcom
Fuller House (disambiguation)
House full (disambiguation)